Helix Nebula may refer to:
Helix Nebula, a large planetary nebula in the Aquarius constellation.
The Helix Nebula, a progressive metal band from Sydney, Australia.